Alexander Wilson Arnold (1 May 1928 – 2017) was a Scottish footballer who played as a defender. Arnold began his senior career in the early 1950s with Dundee United, having previously played with Dundonald Bluebell. Featuring in over 100 league matches for The Terrors, Arnold went on to play for Stirling Albion and Berwick Rangers after leaving Tannadice. Arnold died in Kirkcaldy in 2017, at the age of 89.

References

1928 births
2017 deaths
Scottish footballers
Scottish Football League players
Dundee United F.C. players
Stirling Albion F.C. players
Berwick Rangers F.C. players
Footballers from Edinburgh
Dundonald Bluebell F.C. players
Association football defenders